Hanserd Knollys  (1599–1691) was an English particular Baptist minister.

Life
He was born at Cawkwell, Lincolnshire, about 1599. He was educated privately under a tutor, was for a short time at Great Grimsby grammar school, and afterwards matriculated at St Catharine's College, Cambridge in 1627 or 1629. Leaving the university, he became master of the grammar school at Gainsborough, Lincolnshire. In 1620 he was ordained (29 June, deacon; 30 June, priest), and he was presented to the vicarage of Humberston, Lincolnshire, by John Williams, at that time bishop of Lincoln. He preached also every Sunday in the neighbouring churches of Holton-le-Clay and Scartho, but in two or three years resigned his living owing to scruples about ceremonies and admission to the communion, continuing, however, to preach. By 1636 he had become a separatist, and renounced his orders. He removed to London with his wife and family, and shortly afterwards fled to New England to escape the high commission court. A warrant from that court reached him at Boston, but after a brief imprisonment he was allowed to remain unmolested. He preached at Dover, New Hampshire. Cotton Mather enumerated him among 'godly anabaptists;' quite when he adopted doctrine and practice to justify the comment is not clear.

On 24 December 1641 he reached London on his return, which was for his aged father, He opened a boarding-school on Great Tower Hill. Soon afterwards he was elected to the mastership of the free school in the parish of St. Mary Axe. After about a year he gave it up to become an army chaplain; but dissatisfied with the parliamentary commanders, he returned to London and to school-keeping. He learned Hebrew from Christian Ravis of Berlin. In 1644 he preached in London and Suffolk churches and churchyards, and occasionally, in what afterwards became quaker fashion, endeavouring to supplement the regular sermon by a discourse of his own. This led, according to Thomas Edwards, to tumults. Knollys was twice brought before a committee of parliament, but on each occasion was absolved from blame and protected. In 1645, with Benjamin Cox and others, Knollys was the author of A Declaration concerning the Publicke Dispute which should have been in the Meeting House of Aldermanbury, December 3 1645, concerning Infant Baptism.

He gathered a church of his own in 1646, meeting first for about a year, in Great St. Helen's, then in Finsbury Fields, next in Coleman Street, subsequently in George Yard, Whitechapel, and ultimately at Broken Wharf, Thames Street. His most important convert was Henry Jessey, whom he baptised in June 1645. A letter (11 January 1646) from him to John Dutton of Norwich, in favour of toleration, printed by Edwards in Gangraena, embittered the presbyterians against him. He subscribed the second edition (1646) of the confession of faith issued by London baptists, though not the original edition (1644). On 17 Jan. 1649 parliament gave a commission to him and William Kiffin to preach in Suffolk, on petition from inhabitants of Ipswich. His name is attached to pleas for toleration addressed to parliament in 1651 and 1654, and to Oliver Cromwell on 3 April 1657.

Between 1645 and the Restoration Knollys met with no interference. He held some offices of profit under Cromwell's government. On the outbreak (7 January 1661) of Thomas Venner's insurrection he was committed to Newgate Prison on suspicion, and detained till the act of grace on the king's coronation (23 April) liberated him. It was not safe for him to resume his ministry in London; after time in Wales and Lincolnshire he went to Germany, where he remained two or three years, returning at length to London by way of Rotterdam. In his absence, Colonel William Legge in the king's name took possession of his property.

In London he once more resumed his school and his pastorate, preaching also a morning lecture on Sundays at Pinners' Hall, Old Broad Street, then in the hands of independents. On 10 May 1670 he was arrested at his meeting in George Yard, under the  Conventicles Act 1670. He was committed to the Bishopgate compter, but was considerately treated and was allowed to preach to the prisoners; at the next Old Bailey sessions he obtained his discharge. He survived the Act of Toleration 1689 and despite old age, took part in efforts to consolidate the Baptists. He continued preaching to the last, with Robert Steed as his assistant.

He died on 19 September 1691, in his ninety-third year, and was buried in Bunhill Fields. The funeral sermon was preached by Thomas Harrison (1699–1702), particular Baptist minister at Petty France, and afterwards at Loriners' Hall. He married in 1630 or 1631; his wife died on 30 April 1671; he had at least three sons and a daughter; Isaac, his last surviving son, died on 16 November 1671.

Works
 A Glimpse of Sion's Glory (1641)
 Christ Exalted (1645)
 An Exposition of the Eleventh Chapter of Revelation (1679)
 An Exposition of the First Chapter of the Song of Solomon (1656)
 An Exposition of the Whole Book of Revelation (1689)
 Mystical Babylon Unveiled ... (1679)
 The Parable of the Kingdom of Heaven Expounded (1674)
 The Rudiments of the Hebrew Grammar in English (1648)
 The Shining of a Flaming-fire in Zion (1646)

Legacy
The Hanserd Knollys Society was founded in London in 1845, "for the publication of the works of early English and other Baptist writers". A total of ten volumes were published. Seven of the volumes were edited by Edward Bean Underhill. Other volumes were edited by George Offor, the Reverend C. Stovel, and the Reverend F. A. Cox. The two volumes by Thieleman J. van Braght were translated from the Dutch by the Reverend Benjamin Millard, while the first of the two volumes has illustrations by the engraver Jan Luyken.

 1 
 2  
 3  
 4  
 5  
 6  
 7  
 8  
 9  
 10

Notes

External links
Book by Knollys Christ Exalted
Book by Knollys Mystery Babylon

Bibliography

1599 births
1691 deaths
English Baptist ministers
Alumni of St Catharine's College, Cambridge
Burials at Bunhill Fields